Maiden Voyage is the fifth album led by jazz musician Herbie Hancock, and was recorded by Rudy Van Gelder on March 17, 1965, for Blue Note Records. It was issued as BLP 4195 and BST 84195. Featuring Hancock with tenor saxophonist George Coleman, trumpeter Freddie Hubbard, bassist Ron Carter and drummer Tony Williams, it is a concept album aimed at creating an oceanic atmosphere. As such, many of the track titles refer to marine biology or the sea, and the musicians develop the concept through their use of space. The album was presented with the Grammy Hall of Fame Award in 1999.

Overview
Coleman, Carter, Williams and Hancock himself were all recently a part of the Miles Davis quintet.

According to Bob Blumenthal's 1999 liner notes: "Blue Note logs indicate that an attempt had been made to record 'Maiden Voyage', 'Little One', and 'Dolphin Dance' six days earlier, with Hubbard on cornet and Stu Martin in place of Williams. Those performances were rejected at the time and have been lost in the ensuing years." A different version of "Little One" was recorded by Miles Davis and his quintet (by then including Wayne Shorter instead of Coleman) for the album E.S.P., also released in 1965.

Hancock cites Count Basie's "Shiny Stockings" as the main source of inspiration for "Dolphin Dance".

Reception
The Penguin Guide to Jazz designated the album as part of its Core Collection with a four star rating, calling it "a colossal achievement from a man still just 24 years old". Stephen Thomas Erlewine of AllMusic describes the album as "arguably his finest record of the '60s, reaching a perfect balance between accessible, lyrical jazz and chance-taking hard bop".

Legacy
"Maiden Voyage", "The Eye of the Hurricane" and "Dolphin Dance" have become jazz standards and are featured in Hal Leonard's New Real Book vol. 2. While being interviewed for KCET in 2011, Hancock said he considered "Maiden Voyage" to be his favorite of all of the compositions he had written. During an interview on KTLA in 2020, the composer told Frank Buckley that he originally wrote the tune for a television commercial. Hancock was the pianist on another version of "Maiden Voyage" for Bobby Hutcherson's album Happenings which was recorded in February 1966. Hancock rerecorded "Maiden Voyage" and "Dolphin Dance" on his 1974 album Dedication and updated the title track on his 1988 album Perfect Machine. "Dolphin Dance" was rerecorded in 1981 for the Herbie Hancock Trio album.  Hancock has released live concert versions of "Maiden Voyage" on CoreaHancock (1979) and An Evening With Herbie Hancock & Chick Corea: In Concert (1980) (both with Chick Corea). Hancock recorded "Maiden Voyage" and "Eye of the Hurricane" with the VSOP Quintet on VSOP: Tempest in the Colosseum (1977).

Track listing

Personnel 
 Herbie Hancock – piano
 Freddie Hubbard – trumpet
 George Coleman – tenor saxophone
 Ron Carter – bass
 Tony Williams – drums

Cover versions
Artists who have covered "Maiden Voyage", the title track, include:
Bobby Hutcherson, on his 1966 album Happenings
Brian Auger and the Trinity, on the 1970 album Befour
Grant Green, on his 1970 live album Alive! (CD reissue only)
Blood, Sweat, and Tears, on their 1972 album New Blood
Kellee Patterson, on her 1973 album Maiden Voyage
Bobby Valentín, on his 1975 live album Va a la Cárcel
Gary Boyle, on his 1978 album The Dancer
The rock band Phish performed the song in their early concerts. A live version was released on their album Colorado '88.
Toto, on their 2002 album Through the Looking Glass. This recording included elements of Hancock's 1974 song "Butterfly".
Robert Glasper, on his 2004 album Mood. He recorded it again on his 2007 album In My Element.
Austin Peralta, on his 2006 album Maiden Voyage
Joey Alexander, on his 2016 album Countdown

Artists who have covered "Dolphin Dance" include:
Ahmad Jamal, on his 1971 album The Awakening
Grover Washington Jr., on his 1976 album A Secret Place
Bill Evans, on the 1980 album I Will Say Goodbye
Kazumi Watanabe, on his 1989 album Kilowatt

Other covers include:
Christian McBride, Nicholas Payton, and Mark Whitfield recorded a version of "The Eye of the Hurricane" on their 1997 album Fingerpainting: The Music of Herbie Hancock.
Madlib remixed "Dolphin Dance" and combined it with the song "Peace" by Horace Silver on his 2003 album Shades of Blue.
In 2008, jazz pianist John Beasley released a tribute to Hancock called Letter to Herbie, which features a re-working of "Maiden Voyage" called "Bedtime Voyage". The album also features a recording of "Eye of the Hurricane".

Charts

See also

1965 in music
Herbie Hancock discography

References

1965 albums
Blue Note Records albums
Herbie Hancock albums
Concept albums
Albums produced by Alfred Lion
Grammy Hall of Fame Award recipients
Albums recorded at Van Gelder Studio